Dasampatti, also called Kallavi, is a village in Krishnagiri district, Tamil Nadu, India.

Geography
Dasampatti is located at an elevation of 330 m above mean sea level. 

There is no rain in a couple of years. There was one lake called Dasampatti lake and for more than two decades, people never seen water and 99% of people forgot the lake area. Many Pachayat presidents came and there was not any difference since last 25 years.

Location
Dasampatti has a railway station on the Salem-Jolarpet line.

The nearest airports are Salem Airport and Bangalore International Airport.

Temples
The village has a temple called Vediyappan temple.

References

External links
 Satellite map of Dasampatti

Villages in Krishnagiri district